Fedrick Dacres (born 28 February 1994) is a Jamaican discus thrower.

He began his throwing career as a student at Calabar High School in Jamaica along with other accomplished throwers such as Chad Wright and Traves Smikle, under the guidance of former Calabar athlete coach Julian Robinson.

He won a gold medal at the 2011 World Youth Championships in Athletics, becoming the first Jamaican discus thrower ever to do so.
He went on to win a gold medal at the 2012 World Junior Championships in Athletics, also becoming the first Jamaican discus thrower ever to do so.

Dacres participated in the boys' discus throw at the 2010 Summer Youth Olympics.

He has qualified to represent Jamaica at the 2020 Summer Olympics.

References

External links

Fedrick Dacres disqualified throw overturned, sets a new Diamond League Record in Rabat - IAAF 2019 via the Diamond League on YouTube

1994 births
Living people
Sportspeople from Kingston, Jamaica
Jamaican male discus throwers
Pan American Games gold medalists for Jamaica
Pan American Games medalists in athletics (track and field)
Athletes (track and field) at the 2015 Pan American Games
Athletes (track and field) at the 2019 Pan American Games
Athletes (track and field) at the 2010 Summer Youth Olympics
World Athletics Championships athletes for Jamaica
Athletes (track and field) at the 2016 Summer Olympics
Athletes (track and field) at the 2018 Commonwealth Games
Olympic athletes of Jamaica
Commonwealth Games medallists in athletics
Commonwealth Games gold medallists for Jamaica
World Athletics Championships medalists
IAAF Continental Cup winners
Diamond League winners
Jamaican Athletics Championships winners
Commonwealth Games gold medallists in athletics
Pan American Games gold medalists in athletics (track and field)
Medalists at the 2015 Pan American Games
Medalists at the 2019 Pan American Games
Athletes (track and field) at the 2020 Summer Olympics
20th-century Jamaican people
21st-century Jamaican people
Medallists at the 2018 Commonwealth Games